Defending champion Novak Djokovic defeated Rafael Nadal in the final, 6–3, 6–4 to win the singles tennis title at the 2013 ATP World Tour Finals. It was his third Tour Finals title.

Stanislas Wawrinka made his debut at the event.

Seeds

Alternates

Draw

Finals

Group A
Standings are determined by: 1. number of wins; 2. number of matches; 3. in two-players-ties, head-to-head records; 4. in three-players-ties, percentage of sets won, or of games won initially to sort out a superior/inferior player, then head-to-head records; 5. ATP rankings

Group B
Standings are determined by: 1. number of wins; 2. number of matches; 3. in two-players-ties, head-to-head records; 4. in three-players-ties, percentage of sets won, or of games won initially to sort out a superior/inferior player, then head-to-head records; 5. ATP rankings

References

External Links
Main Draw

Singles